Lindsay Sneddon (born 28 January 1962) is a former Australian rules footballer who played with Footscray and the Sydney Swans in the Victorian Football League (VFL).

Sneddon was originally from Deer Park. A ruckman, he made two appearances for Footscray in the 1982 VFL season, then didn't play senior football again until 1985, when he played twice for the Swans.

References

External links
 
 

1962 births
Australian rules footballers from Victoria (Australia)
Western Bulldogs players
Sydney Swans players
Living people